John of Saxony (24 August 1498 in Dresden – 11 January 1537 in Dresden), also known as "John the Younger" or "Hans of Saxony" was Hereditary Prince of Saxony from the Albertine line of the House of Wettin.

Life

Early years 
John was the eldest son of the Duke George the Bearded (1471-1539), from his marriage to Barbara Jagiellon (1478-1534), daughter of King Casimir IV of Poland.  Because of the good relationship between his father to the Habsburg family, he was raised in Brussels, together with the future Charles V.  John was introduced at an early age to the business of government by his father, but he soon developed a penchant for idleness, and was more interested in good food, alcohol and parties.

Marriage and death 

On 8 March 1505, George agreed with Landgrave William II of Hesse to the future marriage of George's then 7-year-old son John  with William's 3-year-old daughter Elisabeth of Hesse (1502-1557).  She was the sister of Philip the Magnanimous.  William received 25,000 guilders marriage money.  The marriage took place on 20 May 1516 in Kassel.  Elisabeth leaned towards the Lutheran teachings and soon fell in conflict with her husband and his strict Catholic parents.  John is said to have invited Martin Luther, arguing that, if his father was adamantly against Luther, he would for Luther when he inherited the throne.  After meeting Luther, and realizing that Luther would not outlive George, John became melancholic and fell ill and finally died.

Even at John's death bed, his wife and his father disputed religious issues. Elizabeth left Dresden for her wittum in Rochlitz, where she introduced  Lutheranism.

John and Elisabeth's marriage was childless.  He was buried in Meissen Cathedral and succeeded as hereditary prince of Saxony by his younger brother Frederick.

References 
 Johann Samuel Ersch:  General Encyclopedia of the sciences and arts in alphabetical ..., p. 201
 Martina Schattkowsky: Widow in the early modern period between royal and noble widows ..., p. 197
 Matthias Donath  The grave monuments in the cathedral of Meissen, p. 403 ff.

Footnotes 

1498 births
1537 deaths
Crown Princes of Saxony
House of Wettin
Nobility from Dresden
German people of Polish descent
Albertine branch
Heirs apparent who never acceded
Sons of monarchs